The Fundy-class minesweepers were a class of four minesweepers operated by the Royal Canadian Navy during the Second World War. All four ships entered service in 1938 and the class were discarded in 1945, sold for mercantile service. Three ended up sold to Chinese interests, while one remained active in Canada until 1987.

The class derives its name from the lead ship  and are all named after bays in Canada. The Fundy-class minesweepers were modified versions of the British Basset-class trawler minesweepers. The Canadian ships were given extra strengthening for ice conditions. Two were initially assigned to the West Coast of Canada and two, including Fundy, to the East Coast.

Design and description 
By 1930 the s which had been re-designated as minesweepers in November 1922 were coming to the end of their effective service lives. In 1935, all three remaining minesweepers active in the Royal Canadian Navy were laid up. In the naval estimates of the 1936 budget, provision was made to replace two of the Battle class with two new, modern minesweepers.

In 1938 four hulls were laid down in four shipyards across the country to be completed by the end of the year. The two minesweepers built on the East Coast would cost $318,000 per vessel and the two constructed on the West Coast, $403,000 per vessel. At the outbreak of the Second World War, the Royal Canadian Navy considered constructing more, but chose to build s instead upon learning of that design. The Bangors burned oil instead of coal and had much greater endurance.

The vessels, based on the British Basset-class trawlers, displaced . They had a complement of 3 officers and 35 ratings.

The Fundy class was propelled by one shaft driven by a vertical triple expansion engine powered by steam from a one-cylinder boiler.

The ships were armed with either one QF  Mk IV gun mounted forward on a raised platform, or with one QF 12-pounder 12 cwt naval gun. The minesweepers were armed with two 20 mm Oerlikon anti-aircraft cannon. They were later equipped with 25 depth charges.

Ships in class

Service history

The class was ordered from four different shipyards spread across Canada. Fundy was ordered from Collingwood Shipyards Ltd in Ontario and launched on 18 June 1938; Comox from Burrard Dry Dock in British Columbia, launched on 9 August 1938; Gaspé from Morton Engineering Co in Quebec, launched on 12 August 1938 and Nootka from Yarrows Limited in British Columbia, launched on 26 September 1938.

Initially Comox and Nootka were stationed on the Pacific coast, with Gaspé and Fundy on the East Coast. They continued this way even after the outbreak of the Second World War, until March 1940 when Comox and Nootka were transferred to the East Coast. During the war they spent most of their time performing minesweeping duties around Halifax.

In July 1942, Fundy was used as to escort a convoy from Halifax to Boston, Massachusetts and another back to Halifax in the Battle of the Atlantic. On 1 April 1943, Nootka was renamed Nanoose in order to release her original name to a newly constructed destroyer. In January 1945, Fundy and Comox rescued survivors from the merchant vessel Martin Van Buren which had been torpedoed.

In July 1945, all four ships were paid off to be sold into mercantile service. Three were sold to Chinese interests in 1946 and converted into tugboats. Comox was renamed Sung Ming, Gaspé renamed Sung Li, and Nanoose renamed Sung Ling. Fundy was sold to Marine Industries in 1947 where she was converted for mercantile purposes. Her career ended in 1987 when the ship was broken up at La Malbaie, Quebec.

See also 

 List of ships of the Royal Canadian Navy

References

Notes

Citations

References

External links 

 Fundy class – hazegray.org

Mine warfare vessel classes